Mary Morello (born October 1, 1923) is an American activist who founded the anti-censorship group Parents for Rock and Rap in 1987.

Early life
Morello was born in 1923 in Marseilles, Illinois. In 1954, she earned a master's degree in African and Latin American/Peru history at Loyola University in Chicago. She spent the rest of the decade teaching English in Germany, Peru, and Japan while once circling the globe on a freighter.

From 1960–63, Morello lived in Kenya where she married Ngethe Njoroge (brother of Njoroge Mungai and Jemimah Gecaga), an activist who promoted Kenyan independence from the British during the Mau Mau Uprising (1952–1960) and later became the first Kenyan delegate to the United Nations.

Career
In the 1960s, Morello was involved in the Civil Rights Movement and the NAACP. She is a long-time activist for the Chicago Urban League. In 1964, she and her husband moved to Harlem, New York, where she gave birth to their son, Tom.

Morello and Ngethe divorced when Tom was one year old in 1965. Morello then moved with her son to Libertyville, Illinois, a small suburb north of Chicago. She took a job at Libertyville High School teaching social studies and US history. In 1987, she quit her teaching job of twenty-two years and founded Parents for Rock and Rap, an anti-censorship counterweight to Tipper Gore's Parents Music Resource Center. She made three trips to the Soviet Union, through Siberia and Mongolia.

In 1991, Morello and many others battled against legislation being proposed in Congress titled Pornography Victims Compensation Act, numbered S. 983, or, later, S. 1521. The legislation was not enacted, in part because of grass-roots activism. On June 24, 1996, she received the Hugh M. Hefner First Amendment Award in Arts and Entertainment for her work with Parents for Rock and Rap.

In the fall of 1991, Morello began a volunteer teaching job at the Salvation Army Rehabilitation Center in Waukegan, Illinois, where she taught adult literacy. She was involved in the Cuba Coalition in Chicago, which works toward lifting the U.S. embargo against Cuba.

Morello is also known for her involvement in the 1999 debate on the incarceration of death row inmate Mumia Abu-Jamal, convicted (some believe wrongly) of the 1982 shooting of a Philadelphia police officer. In an editorial she said: 

In 2007, Morello had a podcast together with Cindy Sheehan called The Mary Morello and Cindy Sheehan Show.

Personal life
Morello was married to Ngethe Njoroge, a Kenyan journalist and diplomat. They had one son, Rage Against the Machine guitarist Tom Morello, but divorced a year after he was born.

Public Appearances
Before Rage Against the Machine hit the stage at the Pinkpop Festival in 1994, Morello introduced them as the "Best Band in the Fucking Universe". On August 24, 2007, for the Rage Against the Machine reunion, she appeared again. On September 13, 2016 at a Prophets of Rage concert, she introduced them as "The best fucking band in the universe."

References

1923 births
American people of Italian descent
American people of Irish descent
American women podcasters
American podcasters
American political activists
Schoolteachers from Illinois
American women educators
American expatriates in Germany
American expatriates in Peru
American expatriates in Japan
American expatriates in Kenya
Living people
Loyola University Chicago alumni
Kenyatta family